Ballinagree, sometimes Ballynagree, is a small village situated at the foot of the Boggeragh Mountains in County Cork, Ireland. It is located in Roman Catholic Diocese of Cloyne, in the Parish of Aghinagh, which also has Rusheen, Bealnamorive and parts of Carrigadrohid in it. Ballinagree is part of the Cork North-West (Dáil constituency).

Ballinagree and its surrounding area comprise one of the richest areas in northern Europe for Megalithic monuments. It is located 18 miles (29 km) west of Cork city, 10 km north east of Macroom, 6 km west of Rylane, 13 km north west of Coachford, 17 km south east of Millstreet and 20 km west of Blarney.

In the late 1990s and early 2000s, a number of housing estates were developed, but the properties were not sold; leaving the village with so-called "ghost estates".

It is known as the residence of the subject of the Irish folk song "Thady Quill".

References

External links
 St John's Well

Towns and villages in County Cork